This fighter is sometimes called "PZL.62", but the correct designation is PZL.55.

PZL.55 was a Polish pre-war initial project for a fighter aircraft, designed by Jerzy Dąbrowski of the PZL works. The design was for a single-seat low-wing monoplane, developed from the PZL.26 sports plane and private sports plane project designed by Jerzy Dąbrowski for his own purposes.

The prototype PZL.55/I was designed for the Hispano-Suiza 12Y inline engine but production aircraft were intended to be powered by Hispano-Suiza 12Z inline engines.

Planned specifications (PZL.55)

References

Bibliography

 Glass, Andrzej. Polskie Konstrukcje Lotnicze Vol.3 (In Polish). Sandomierz, Poland: Wydawnictwo Stratus, 2008.

See also

1930s Polish fighter aircraft
World War II Polish fighter aircraft
PZL aircraft
Low-wing aircraft
Single-engined tractor aircraft